Mark Anthony Bringas (born April 27, 1988) is a Filipino professional basketball player for the Nueva Ecija Rice Vanguards in the Maharlika Pilipinas Basketball League (MPBL). He was drafted by Meralco Bolts with their 44th pick in the 2013 PBA draft.

References

Living people
1988 births
Filipino men's basketball players
Basketball players from Bataan
Meralco Bolts players
FEU Tamaraws basketball players
Power forwards (basketball)
Centers (basketball)
Meralco Bolts draft picks